Sylvester Alexander Jasper (born 13 September 2001) is a professional footballer who plays as a forward for Fulham. Born in England, he represents Bulgaria at youth level.

Club career
Jasper started his youth career in Queens Park Rangers at age of 9 and moved to Fulham 2 years later.  In January 2020 he made his professional debut for the team in a FA Cup match against Manchester City. On 25 August 2020, Jasper signed his first professional contract with Fulham.

On 4 August 2021, Jasper joined League Two side Colchester United on loan until January 2022. He made his debut from the bench on 7 August in Colchester's 0–0 draw with Carlisle United.

On 31 January 2022, Jasper joined Scottish club Hibernian on loan for the rest of the season, which included an option to buy at the end of the season. Jasper made 16 appearances for Hibs during the loan, but they declined the option to sign him permanently.

On 1 September 2022, Jasper signed for League One club Bristol Rovers on loan for the 2022–23 season. He made his debut two days later as a second half substitute in a 2–2 draw with Morecambe. After being left out of the squad for a 2–2 draw against Plymouth Argyle, Rovers manager Joey Barton announced that Jasper was returning to Fulham due to him being unhappy with the amount of game time he has been given.

International career
Jasper was born in England to a Nigerian father and a Bulgarian mother, making him eligible to represent the three countries internationally. In 2016 he represented England at the under-15 level.

On 2 November 2021, Jasper received his first call-up to the Bulgarian under-21 side for 2023 UEFA European Under-21 Championship qualification matches against the Netherlands under-21 and Moldova under-21 sides. He made his debut for the team in the match against the Netherlands.

Personal life
He attended St Richard Reynolds Roman Catholic College in Twickenham from 2013 to 2017.

Career statistics

Club

References

2001 births
Living people
Footballers from Southwark
Bulgarian footballers
Bulgaria youth international footballers
English footballers
England youth international footballers
Bulgarian people of Nigerian descent
English people of Nigerian descent
English people of Bulgarian descent
Association football forwards
Fulham F.C. players
Colchester United F.C. players
Hibernian F.C. players
Bristol Rovers F.C. players
English Football League players
Scottish Professional Football League players